Marius Jouveau (8 January 1878 – 14 October 1949) was a French poet. He served as the capoulie (or president) of the Félibrige from 1922 to 1941. On 11 August 1940 Jouveau wrote a letter to Marshal Philippe Pétain arguing that the Révolution nationale and the Félibrige shared the same values.

Works

References

1878 births
1949 deaths
Writers from Avignon
Writers from Aix-en-Provence
20th-century French poets